Heinz Günthardt and Balázs Taróczy were the defending champions.

Pavel Složil and Tomáš Šmíd won the title by defeating Anders Järryd and Hans Simonsson 1–6, 6–3, 3–6, 6–4, 6–3 in the final.

Draw
Note: the first round is still missing

References

World Championship Tennis World Doubles Draws
1984 World Championship Tennis circuit